Rogério Fonseca da Silva (born 24 March 1970 in Brazil) is a Brazilian retired footballer.

Career

In 2001, Esquerdinha aimed to become the oldest player ever to retire in Brazil. He later aimed to play for 40 clubs in his career.

In 2002, Esquerdinha made his international debut in a friendly against Bolivia. In 2015, he said that people were suspicious of Sao Caetano, who were 2000 Brazilian league runners-up despite being in the second division, because of their fast rise which resulted in few of their players being called up.

After returning to Barretos in 2015, he was judged to be physically unwell and left out of the squad despite featuring in seven out of eight games in a row. As a result, he has complained that there was a prejudice of older players in Brazil.

References

External links
 Esquerdinha at National Football Teams

Brazilian footballers
Living people
1970 births
Association football midfielders
Brazil international footballers
Mesquita Futebol Clube players
Barretos Esporte Clube players